"Reverse Cowgirl" is a song recorded by American R&B artist T-Pain. It originally served as the second promotional single off T-Pain's fourth studio album RevolveЯ, but never made it on the track list. Originally featuring a verse from Young Jeezy, this was later cut and replaced with a bridge sung by T-Pain, and backgrounds sung by Jon A. Gordon, Michael A. Gordon (The Gordon Brothers), and Courtney Vantrease, Robert Brent (One Chance).

Music video
The music video was released on March 18, and was directed by Jeremy Rall. T-Pain's comment of the video: "It's all about art. I wanted to do something different."

Remix
The official remix featuring the duo Wisin & Yandel, premiered on August 21 by the program El Coyote The Show, the reggaeton station 94 of Puerto Rico, the song was included on their live album La Revolución: Live.

Charts
On the week ending April 10, 2010, "Reverse Cowgirl" debuted at number 75 on the US Billboard Hot 100. The song also charted at number 22 on the Australian ARIA Urban Charts, for the week beginning April 11.

References

2010 songs
Jive Records singles
Music videos directed by Jeremy Rall
Song recordings produced by Kane Beatz
Songs written by T-Pain
T-Pain songs
Wisin & Yandel songs
Songs written by Kane Beatz
Songs written by Wisin
Songs written by Yandel
2010 singles